Ernest William Pearson Chinnery (5 November 1887 – 17 December 1972)  was an Australian anthropologist and public servant. He worked extensively in Papua New Guinea and visited communities along the Sepik river.

Bibliography and sources
Chinnery Papers (Australian National Library)
E. J. B. Foxcroft, Australian Native Policy (Melb, 1941)
C. D. Rowley, The Destruction of Aboriginal Society (Canb, 1970);
Northern Territory, Annual Report, 1938–39; New Guinea, Report on the Administration of the Territory, 1938–39;
Government Gazette (Commonwealth), 14 Sept 1939
D. J. F. Griffiths, The Career of F. E. Williams, Government Anthropologist of Papua, 1922–1943 (M.A. thesis, Australian National University, 1977)
Gilbert Murray papers (National Library of Australia); A56, A73, A452 59/6066, 6067, A518 C828/2 (National Archives of Australia).

References

Australian anthropologists
1887 births
1972 deaths
20th-century anthropologists